Viviennea flavicincta is a moth in the family Erebidae first described by Gottlieb August Wilhelm Herrich-Schäffer in 1855. It is found in Colombia and Brazil.

References

Phaegopterina
Moths described in 1855